Khirbet el-Qom is an archaeological site in the village of al-Kum, West Bank, in the territory of the biblical Kingdom of Judah, between Lachish and Hebron, 14 km to the west of the latter.

Excavations 
Archaeological excavations were conducted at the site in 1967 by William G. Dever on behalf of the Hebrew Union College.

Findings

Iron Age 
Two Iron Age bench tombs carved into natural rock were discovered at el-Qom; both were investigated by William Dever in 1967 following their discovery by tomb robbers. Both tombs contain inscriptions, dating from the second half of the 8th century BCE, slightly after the Asherah-relating Kuntillet Ajrud inscriptions. The inscription from Tomb 2 is associated with a "magic hand" symbol, and reads:
"Uriyahu the honourable has written this
Blessed is/be Uriyahu by Yahweh
And [because?] from his oppressors by his asherah he has saved him
[written] by Oniyahu"
"...by his asherah
...and his asherah"

Unlike the Kuntillet Ajrud inscriptions, they do not include a place name with the name of Yahweh (the Kuntillet Ajrud inscriptions talk of "Yahweh of Samaria" and "Yahweh of Teman"); this seems to indicate that they were written after the fall of Samaria, which left Yahweh as the god of one state only.

There is some scholarly debate about the translation, particularly for line three.

A jug inscribed "to or for Yahmol" and a bowl inscribed "El" was also found.

Persian and Hellenistic periods 
One thousand seven hundred ostraca in Aramaic may have been found on the site and the vicinity, dating from the Persian and Hellenistic periods, during which the area was classified as the Persian province of Idumea, with a mixed population of Edomites, Jews and Arabs. The site is called Maqqedah in the Idumean ostraca. Based on this, some scholars identify Khirbet el-Qom with biblical Makkedah.

Roman period 
A burial cave in El-Qom contained three Hebrew funerary inscriptions dating from the 1st century BCE to the 2nd century CE, bearing names such as Miriam and Shalom. Currently, they are housed in the Israel Antiquities Authority storage facilities in Beth Shemesh.

See also
 Asherah
 Biblical archaeology
 Cities of the ancient Near East
 History of ancient Israel and Judah
 Kuntillet Ajrud

References

Ancient Jewish settlements of Judaea
Archaeological sites in the State of Palestine
Asherah
Hebron Governorate
Yahweh
Edom
1967 archaeological discoveries